State Highway 345 (SH 345) is a short spur route from Interstate 69E/U.S. Highway 77/U.S. Highway 83 in San Benito northeast to Rio Hondo in deep southern Texas.  The route was designated on February 20, 1942. On September 26, 1945, SH 345 was rerouted to end at FM 106 east of Rio Hondo, rather than directly in Rio Hondo.

Route description
SH 345 begins at a junction with I-69E/US 77/US 83 in San Benito. The intersection is exit 19B off of I-69E and also serves as the northern terminus of Farm to Market Road 2520. It heads northeast from this junction as it continues through San Benito to an intersection with US 77 Bus.  The highway continues through San Benito to the northeast to an intersection with FM 3462.  Heading towards the northeast, the highway continues to a junction with FM 1561.  SH 345 reaches its northern terminus at FM 106 just east of Rio Hondo and next to the Rio Hondo High School. The name of the highway throughout its entire length is Sam Houston Boulevard.

Junction list

References

345
Transportation in Cameron County, Texas